

Bryophytes

Arthropods

Insects

Molluscs

Newly named bivalves

Archosauromorphs

Newly named dinosaurs
Data courtesy of George Olshevsky's dinosaur genera list.

Note: the name Lancangosaurus is mistakenly treated as a nomen nudum synonymous with Datousaurus (because Dong et al. 1983 believed it to be conspecific with Datousaurus). However, it is actually an early spelling variant of another nomen nudum, Lancangjiangosaurus.

Newly named birds

Pterosauria

Newly named pterosaurs

Lepidosauromorphs

Plesiosaurs
 Plesiosaur gastroliths documented.

References

 Darby, D. G. and Ojakangas, R. W.; 1980; Gastroliths from a Late Cretaceous Plesiosaur; Journal of Paleontology; 54(3) pp. 548–556
 Sanders F, Manley K, Carpenter K. Gastroliths from the Lower Cretaceous sauropod Cedarosaurus weiskopfae. In: Tanke D.H, Carpenter K, editors. Mesozoic vertebrate life: new research inspired by the paleontology of Philip J. Currie. Indiana University Press; Bloomington, IN: 2001. pp. 166–180.

 
Paleontology
Paleontology 0